Albert Broadbent  (15 February 1867 – 21 January 1912) was an English food lecturer, writer and vegetarianism activist.

Biography 
Broadbent was born in Hollingworth; he later married Christina Harrison. Broadbent became the secretary of the Vegetarian Society in 1895. He represented the International Congresses at Paris, Dresden, St. Louis and London. He was an active member of the Vegetarian Federal Union and attended all their meetings from 1893.  

Broadbent was Secretary of the Vegetarian Society (1895–1912) and was succeeded by Henry Brown Amos. He lectured extensively on food reform. Broadbent was a Fellow of the Statistical Society and the Royal Horticultural Society. He was editor of The Vegetarian Messenger and Health Review. 

Broadbent's book Science in the Daily Meal argued that a vegetarian diet is capable of providing the body its highest state of physical development. Broadbent listed one hundred Uric Acid free recipes. The book promoted the consumption of plasmon but this food was controversial as not all vegetarians advocated its use. In 1903, J. P. Sandlands wrote a rebuttal to Broadbent's book entitled Science in the Daily Meal Criticised, or Plasmon Confounded. Broadbent published an abridged edition of Howard Williams' book The Ethics of Diet, in 1907.

Broadbent started vegetarian eating establishments in Edinburgh, Aberdeen and Leicester, with the intention of bettering the social position of women, by providing them the opportunity to earn a living wage. The meals were also provided at a low price, so that poorer people would be able to access vegetarian meals; this enterprise ended in failure and, as result, Broadbent suffered a significant financial loss. After experiencing a complete nervous breakdown, Broadbent died on 21 January 1912.

Selected publications

Forty Vegetarian Dinners (1900)
Andrew Glendinning’s Apple Tree Cookery Book and Guide to Rational Diet (Edited and Arranged by Albert Broadbent, 1902)
"Diet in Relation To the Problem of Poverty" (Journal of the Sanitary Institute, 1902)
"Shall We Slay to Eat?" (Good Health, November 1902), pp. 537–538
Science in the Daily Meal (1902)
The Vegetarian Textbook (Edited by Albert Broadbent, 1903)
The Building of the Body (1903)
How to Keep Warm (1904)
Fruits, Nuts and Vegetables: Their Use as Food and Medicine (1908)
Salads: Their Uses as Food & Medicine (1909)
"Fifty Valuable Meatless Recipes" (Physical Culture, 1910)
160 Meatless Recipes (1925)

References

1867 births
1912 deaths
19th-century English non-fiction writers
20th-century English non-fiction writers
Anti-vivisectionists
British vegetarianism activists
English food writers
Fellows of the Royal Horticultural Society
Fellows of the Royal Statistical Society
Lecturers
People associated with the Vegetarian Society
Vegetarian cookbook writers